Ignatz "Ignace" Kowalczyk (29 December 1913 – 27 March 1996) was a footballer. Born in Germany, Kowalczyk represented the  France national team.

Personal life
Born in Castrop, he was of Polish descent. He moved to France at a young age.

References

External links
 
 
 Ignace Kowalczyk Profile at Om1899.com
 

1913 births
Year of death missing
French footballers
France international footballers
German footballers
French people of Polish descent
German people of Polish descent
German emigrants to France
Ligue 1 players
RC Lens players
Valenciennes FC players
Olympique de Marseille players
FC Metz players
Stade de Reims players
1938 FIFA World Cup players
French football managers
FC Metz managers
Association football midfielders